James Richard McIntyre (May 25, 1930 – March 7, 1984) was an American attorney and politician who served as Mayor of Quincy, Massachusetts, and as a member of the Massachusetts General Court.

Early life
McIntyre was born on May 25, 1930, in Quincy. He earned an undergraduate degree from the College of the Holy Cross in 1951. McIntyre then served in the United States Marine Corps during the Korean War and was decorated for distinguished service. After the war he received a law degree from the Harvard Law School in 1956 and a master's degree in political science from Boston University in 1960.

Political career
From 1956 to 1959, McIntyre was a member of the Quincy city council. During his last year on the council, he served as president. From 1959 to 1965 he was a member of the Massachusetts House of Representatives. In 1964 he was elected to the Massachusetts Senate. The following year he was elected Mayor of Quincy. He defeated his opponent by a 3 to 1 margin to become the first Democrat elected mayor of Quincy since 1911. He held both positions until 1971 when he resigned to become the Massachusetts Senate's legal counsel. McIntyre died suddenly on March 7, 1984, at Massachusetts General Hospital.

References

1930 births
1984 deaths
United States Marine Corps personnel of the Korean War
Boston University College of Arts and Sciences alumni
College of the Holy Cross alumni
Harvard Law School alumni
Massachusetts lawyers
Democratic Party Massachusetts state senators
Mayors of Quincy, Massachusetts
Democratic Party members of the Massachusetts House of Representatives
20th-century American politicians
20th-century American lawyers